Shlomo Katz is a contemporary religious Jewish singer in Israel.

Biography 
Shlomo Katz was born in New Jersey, the son of Cantor Avsholom Katz. His father was an Argentine immigrant from Buenos Aires, and was named for his uncle Avshalom Haviv. His family moved to Israel when he was nine years old and he has subsequently moved back and forth between Los Angeles and Israel. While studying in a Raanana yeshiva, Katz was introduced to the music and teachings of Rabbi Shlomo Carlebach.

Katz received his rabbinical ordination at Yeshivat HaMivtar in Efrat under Rosh HaYeshiva, Rav Chaim Brovender.
Shlomo has been invited as a scholar in residence to university campuses and synagogues to teach Torah and give concerts, lead melave malkas and kumsitzim. He was the lead Baal Tefilah and spiritual guide in the Carlebach Minyan of Beth Jacob of Beverly Hills.

Today, Shlomo serves as the Rabbi and spiritual leader of Cong. Shirat David in Efrat, where he teaches several Torah classes weekly on various topics.

His brother,  Reb Eitan, is also a well-known performer and the two often perform together.

Musical style 
Shlomo was born into a family of musicians, most notably his father Cantor Avshalom Katz. As a youth he sang in choirs and was trained in violin for seven years. Shlomo eventually switched to guitar and is best known for his performances with that instrument.
He is a headliner in the post-Carlebach musical movement performing both his own compositions and covers.

Discography 
 Eilecha (with Avshalom and Eitan Katz) (1999)
 Biglal Avos (with Eitan Katz) (2001)
 VeHakohanim (2006)
 K'Shoshana (with Chaim-Dovid Saracik & Aharon Razel (2008)
 Malei Olam (2009)
 Live From Melbourne (2012)
 Likrat Shabbat (2014)
 Yismach Melech (2016)
 Brit Avot (2018)
 A Moment To Breathe (2021)
 Breslov (2022)

References 

Hasidic singers
Jewish American composers
Jewish American musicians
American Orthodox Jews
Hasidic entertainers
Living people
1980 births
People from New Jersey
Date of birth missing (living people)
Place of birth missing (living people)
Shlomo Carlebach
Jewish folk singers